Polisportiva Filottrano Pallavolo is an Italian volleyball club based in Filottrano, most famous for its women's team which currently plays in the Serie A1.

Previous names
Due to sponsorship, the club have competed under the following names:
 Atletico San Cristoforo (1971–....)
 Polisportiva Filottrano Pallavolo (....–2014)
 Lardini Filottrano (2014–present)

History
In 1971, don Guerriero Giglioni with other young people took a late 1960s team called  ("Flame" in English) and decided to form a club called . It remained mainly an amateur club with its teams (men and women from various age groups) playing in local, regional and lower national leagues until the 1980s, when former first team players became part of the club's organizational structure and the focus became more technical and organized. With sponsors support its teams start making progress and achieving promotions in the Italian leagues. In 2014 the women's team was promoted to Serie A2. In 2017, the women's team won promotion to the Serie A1 by winning the 2016–17 Serie A2 title.

Current squad

Former Teams
Season 2017–2018, as of February 2018.

References

External links

Official website 

Italian women's volleyball clubs
Volleyball clubs established in 1971
1971 establishments in Italy
Province of Ancona
Sport in le Marche
Serie A1 (women's volleyball) clubs